Desmond Green (born October 11, 1989) is an American mixed martial artist who competed in the lightweight division for Ultimate Fighting Championship. Green is the current BYB Extreme Bare Knuckle Middleweight and Police Gazette Diamond Belt champion.

Background
Green wrestled at Rush–Henrietta High School, where he won a state championship. He later wrestled at University at Buffalo, where he worked towards a major degree in social sciences. He was removed from the wrestling team after he tested positive for marijuana. Green was a Mid-American Conference Champion and three-time Division 1 NCAA Qualifier.

Green also worked part-time at Walmart as a cashier before signing a contract with Bellator MMA.

Green has three children: two daughters named Tsajelia, Dahlia and a son named Desmond Jr.

Mixed martial arts career

Early career
Green started his professional career in 2012. He fought mainly for northeastern American promotions.  In the first year of his career, he amassed a record of 8 wins and 1 loss.

Early in 2013, shortly after winning the New England Fights lightweight title with his TKO victory over UFC veteran Henry Martinez, Green signed with Bellator MMA to fight in the featherweight tournament.

Bellator MMA
Green made his promotional debut against Fabrício Guerreiro on September 13, 2013, at Bellator 99 in the quarterfinal match of Bellator season nine featherweight tournament. He lost via unanimous decision.

Green faced Angelo Sanchez on October 25, 2013, at Bellator 105. He won via TKO at 1:04 of round two after the doctor stated Sanchez was unable to continue.

Green faced Mike Richman on February 28, 2014, at Bellator 110 in the quarterfinal match of Bellator season ten featherweight tournament. He won the fight via unanimous decision.  In the semifinals, he faced Will Martinez at Bellator 114 on March 28, 2014.  Green again won the fight via unanimous decision. Green faced Daniel Weichel in the tournament final at Bellator 119.  He lost the fight via submission in the second round.

Green was released from the promotion, along with several others, on August 26, 2014.

Titan Fighting Championship
In early September 2014, it was announced that Green had signed a contract with Titan Fighting Championship.  He made his debut on October 31, 2014, in the main event at Titan FC 31 against Miguel Torres.  Green won the fight via knockout in the first round.

Green next faced UFC veteran Steven Siler on December 19, 2014, at Titan FC 32 for the vacant Titan FC Featherweight Championship.

For his first title defense Green faced UFC and Strikeforce veteran Kurt Holobaugh on March 20, 2015, at Titan FC 33. He was once again forced to cut his dreadlocks to make weight. After a back and forth fight, Green lost the fight via split decision.

Ultimate Fighting Championship
In February 2017, it was announced that Green had signed with the UFC.

Green made his promotional debut against Josh Emmett on April 8, 2017, at UFC 210. He won the fight by split decision.

Green faced Rustam Khabilov on September 2, 2017, at UFC Fight Night 115. He suffered his first loss with the promotion after losing to Khabilov via unanimous decision. After the bout with Khabilov, Desmond signed a new contract with UFC.

Green faced Michel Prazeres on February 3, 2018, at UFC Fight Night 125. At the weigh-ins Prazeres weighed in at 161 pounds, 5 pounds over the lightweight non-title fight upper limit of 156 pounds. As a result, the bout proceeded at a catchweight and Prazeres was fined 20 percent of his purse to Green. He lost the fight via unanimous decision.

Green faced Gleison Tibau on June 1, 2018, at UFC Fight Night 131. He won the fight by unanimous decision.

Green faced Mairbek Taisumov on September 15, 2018, at UFC Fight Night 136.  At weigh-ins, Taisumov weighted five pounds over lightweight non-title fight limit of 161 and he was fined 40 percent of his purse to Green. Green lost a close fight via unanimous decision.

Green faced Ross Pearson on March 30, 2019, at UFC on ESPN 2. He won the fight via technical knockout in round one.

Green faced newcomer Charles Jourdain on May 18, 2019,  at UFC Fight Night: dos Anjos vs. Lee. He won the fight by unanimous decision.

In January 2020, it was reported that Green was released by UFC.

Post-UFC career
Green made his post-UFC debut against Piankhi Zimmerman on March 19, 2022, at Gamebred Fighting Championship: Freedom Fight Night. He won the bout via first round TKO.

Bare Knuckle Boxing 
Green made his bare knuckle boxing debut with BYB on September 11, 2021 against Jeff Chiffens.  On November 19, 2022 at BYB 13 in Tampa, he defeated three-time BKB champion Scott McHugh to capture the inaugural BYB Middleweight title and the Police Gazette Diamond Belt.

Championships and accomplishments

Amateur wrestling
 National Collegiate Athletic Association
 Mid-American Conference 149 lb: Champion  (2009–10)
 Mid-American Conference 149 lb: Runner–up  (2008)
 New York State College Wrestling
 New York State Intercollegiate Championships 149 lb: Runner–up  (2008)
 University at Buffalo Athletics
 UB Open 149 lb: Champion  (2009)
 UB Open 157 lb: 6th place  (2008)
 Cornell University Athletics
 Body Bar Invitational 149 lb: 3rd place  (2008)
 New York State Public High School Athletic Association
 New York State Championship 140 lb: Champion  (2007)
 Empire State Games
 Empire State Championship 143 lb: Champion  (2007)

Mixed martial arts
 Bellator MMA
 Bellator Season 10 Featherweight Tournament Runner-Up
 New England Fights
 NEF Lightweight Championship (One time)
 Titan Fighting Championships
 Titan FC Featherweight Championship (One time, first)

Bare Knuckle Boxing 

 BYB 
 BYB Middleweight Champion (2022–Present)
 Police Gazette Diamond Belt (2022–Present)

Personal life

Vehicle collision and legal problems 

On August 18, 2018, Green was involved in a car accident in Florida  when he lost control of his SUV and veered toward a tractor-trailer, resulting in a five-car crash which killed two people. Green suffered only minor injuries in the accident.  Green was involved in a minor accident two weeks prior to this five-car crash accident where he was cited driving with a suspended license and no proof of insurance with a  toxicology report  that Green tested positive for Cannabinoid, Tetrahydrocannabinol and a blood-alcohol level of 0.14 . Subsequently, on June 26, 2019, it was reported that Green was arrested  and jailed for 20 separate charges, including two second-degree felony counts of DUI manslaughter; four third-degree felony counts of DUI causing serious bodily injury; third-degree felony possession of cocaine; five misdemeanor counts of DUI property damage; and third-degree felony driving with a suspended license with  jail on bonds totaling $194,000.

During his pre-trial release, Green was charged with felony driving without license on January 22, 2020. Subsequently, his release was revoked and Green was jailed, pending his court hearing on March 6, 2020.

Mixed martial arts record

|-
|Win
|align=center|25–8
|Piankhi Zimmerman
|Decision (unanimous)
|Cagezilla FC 66
|
|align=center|3
|align=center|5:00
|Manassas, Virginia, United States
|
|-
|Win
|align=center|24–8
|Piankhi Zimmerman
|TKO (punches)
|Gamebred Fighting Championship: Freedom Fight Night
|
|align=center|1
|align=center|3:26
|Miami, Florida, United States
|
|-
|Win
|align=center|23–8
|Charles Jourdain
|Decision (unanimous)
|UFC Fight Night: dos Anjos vs. Lee
|
|align=center|3
|align=center|5:00
|Rochester, New York, United States
|
|-
|Win
|align=center|22–8
|Ross Pearson
|TKO (punches)
|UFC on ESPN: Barboza vs. Gaethje
|
|align=center|1
|align=center|2:52
|Philadelphia, Pennsylvania, United States
|
|-
|Loss
|align=center|21–8
|Mairbek Taisumov
|Decision (unanimous)
|UFC Fight Night: Hunt vs. Oleinik
|
|align=center|3
|align=center|5:00
|Moscow, Russia
|
|- 
|Win
|align=center|21–7
|Gleison Tibau
|Decision (unanimous)
|UFC Fight Night: Rivera vs. Moraes
|
|align=center|3
|align=center|5:00
|Utica, New York, United States
|
|-
|Loss
|align=center|20–7
|Michel Prazeres
|Decision (unanimous)
|UFC Fight Night: Machida vs. Anders
|
|align=center|3
|align=center|5:00
|Belém, Brazil
|
|-
|Loss
|align=center|20–6
|Rustam Khabilov
|Decision (unanimous)
|UFC Fight Night: Volkov vs. Struve
|
|align=center|3
|align=center|5:00
|Rotterdam, Netherlands
|
|-
|Win
|align=center|20–5
|Josh Emmett
|Decision (split)
|UFC 210
|
|align=center|3
|align=center|5:00
|Buffalo, New York, United States
|
|-
| Win
| align=center | 19–5
| Martin Brown
| Decision (split)
| Titan FC 42
| 
| align=center | 3
| align=center | 5:00
| Coral Gables, Florida, United States
|
|-
| Win
| align=center | 18–5
| James Freeman
| Decision (unanimous)
| Titan FC 40
| 
| align=center | 3
| align=center | 5:00
| Coral Gables, Florida, United States
|
|-
| Win
| align=center | 17–5
| Desmond Hill
| Decision (unanimous)
| FFC 24
| 
| align=center | 3
| align=center | 5:00
| Daytona Beach, Florida, United States
|
|-
| Win
| align=center | 16–5
| David Cubas
| TKO (doctor stoppage)
| World Fighting Championship Akhmat
| 
| align=center | 1
| align=center | 3:48
| Grozny, Russia
|
|-
| Loss
| align=center | 15–5
| Andre Harrison
| Decision (unanimous)
| Titan FC 35
| 
| align=center | 5
| align=center | 5:00
| Ridgefield, Washington, United States
| 
|-
| Win
| align=center | 15–4
| Vince Eazelle
| KO (punch)
| Titan FC 34
| 
| align=center | 1
| align=center | 0:32
| Kansas City, Missouri, United States
|
|-
| Loss
| align=center | 14–4
| Kurt Holobaugh
| Decision (split)
| Titan FC 33
| 
| align=center | 5
| align=center | 5:00
| Mobile, Alabama, United States
| 
|-
| Win
| align=center | 14–3
| Steven Siler
| Decision (unanimous)
| Titan FC 32
| 
| align=center | 5
| align=center | 5:00
| Lowell, Massachusetts, United States
| 
|-
| Win
| align=center | 13–3
| Miguel Torres
| KO (knee and punches)
| Titan FC 31
| 
| align=center | 1
| align=center | 0:46
| Tampa, Florida, United States
|
|-
| Loss
| align=center | 12–3
| Daniel Weichel
| Submission (rear-naked choke)
| Bellator 119
| 
| align=center | 2
| align=center | 2:07
| Rama, Ontario, Canada
| 
|-
| Win
| align=center | 12–2
| Will Martinez
| Decision (unanimous)
| Bellator 114
| 
| align=center | 3
| align=center | 5:00
| West Valley City, Utah, United States
| 
|-
| Win
| align=center | 11–2
| Mike Richman
| Decision (unanimous)
| Bellator 110
| 
| align=center | 3
| align=center | 5:00
| Uncasville, Connecticut, United States
| 
|-
| Win
| align=center | 10–2
| Angelo Sanchez
| TKO (doctor stoppage)
| Bellator 105
| 
| align=center | 2
| align=center | 1:04
| Rio Rancho, New Mexico, United States
|
|-
| Loss
| align=center | 9–2
| Fabrício Guerreiro
| Decision (unanimous)
| Bellator 99
| 
| align=center | 3
| align=center | 5:00
| Temecula, California, United States
| 
|-
| Win
| align=center | 9–1
| Henry Martinez
| TKO (punches)
| NEF: Fight Night 7
| 
| align=center | 2
| align=center | 1:50
| Lewiston, Maine, United States
| 
|-
| Win
| align=center | 8–1
| John Ortolani
| Decision (unanimous)
| CFX 22 – Winter Blast
| 
| align=center | 3
| align=center | 5:00
| Plymouth, Massachusetts, United States
|
|-
| Win
| align=center | 7–1
| Gemiyale Adkins
| Decision (unanimous)
| PA Cage Fight 15
| 
| align=center | 3
| align=center | 5:00
| Wilkes-Barre, Pennsylvania, United States
|
|-
| Loss
| align=center | 6–1
| Rory McDonell
| Submission (gogoplata straight armbar)
| Score Fighting Series 7
| 
| align=center | 1
| align=center | 4:41
| Hamilton, Ontario, Canada
|
|-
| Win
| align=center | 6–0
| Brandon Fleming
| Decision (unanimous)
| NEF: Fight Night 5
| 
| align=center | 3
| align=center | 5:00
| Lewiston, Maine, United States
|
|-
| Win
| align=center | 5–0
| Matt DiMarcantonio
| Decision (unanimous)
| Gladius Fights: Fyvie vs. Carlo-Clauss
| 
| align=center | 3
| align=center | 5:00
| Irving, New York, United States
|
|-
| Win
| align=center | 4–0
| Bruce Boyington
| Submission (arm-triangle choke)
| NEF: Fight Night 4
| 
| align=center | 2
| align=center | N/A
| Lewiston, Maine, United States
|
|-
| Win
| align=center | 3–0
| Ryan Peterson
| Decision (split)
| CFFC 16: Williams vs. Jacoby
| 
| align=center | 3
| align=center | 5:00
| Atlantic City, New Jersey, United States
|
|-
| Win
| align=center | 2–0
| Phillip LeGrand
| Decision (unanimous)
| JB Sports / Live Nation: Rock Out Knock Out
| 
| align=center | 3
| align=center | 5:00
| Asbury Park, New Jersey, United States
|
|-
| Win
| align=center | 1–0
| Rob Font
| Decision (unanimous)
| Premier FC 8
| 
| align=center | 3
| align=center | 5:00
| Holyoke, Massachusetts, United States
|

Mixed martial arts amateur record

|-
| Win
| align=center | 2–0
| Nate Charles
| TKO (punches)
| NEF: Fight Night 1
| 
| align=center | 2
| align=center | 2:47
| Lewiston, Maine, United States
|
|-
| Win
| align=center | 1–0
| Allen Weeks
| Submission (rear-naked choke)
| Raging Wolf 12
| 
| align=center | 1
| align=center | 1:29
| Irving, New York, United States
|

References

External links
 
 

1989 births
Living people
American male mixed martial artists
African-American mixed martial artists
Mixed martial artists from Iowa
Featherweight mixed martial artists
Mixed martial artists utilizing collegiate wrestling
Mixed martial artists utilizing boxing
Ultimate Fighting Championship male fighters
American male sport wrestlers
Buffalo Bulls wrestlers
American male boxers
African-American boxers
Bare-knuckle boxers
Sportspeople from Rochester, New York
21st-century African-American sportspeople
20th-century African-American people